Satora Valley is a village of Dist.

Geography
There are tall pine trees surrounding the village and the lesser Himalayas are to be seen in the distance.  Satora lies in a plain valley. Satora is divided into 7 parts, namely Khakhar, Buni Pand, Kot, Thohr, Panakha, Qilha and Ghohrhi. The population of the Satora Valley is made up of ten thousand people.

People
Satora has a population of about 10,000 individuals. Satora Valley is the center of its many adjacent Villages Like, Kangrohtar, Tareeman, Sunbal Dahra etc. There is one Government High School which has been recently upgraded to Higher Secondary Level. Till recent times means of transportation were limited with only one hand made road but now the roads are being constructed from many sides, people are generally farmers.

Satora belongs to the union council of Nara.  The main clans of the area are Sardars, Karlals, Saadaat, Abbasi and Awans with many sub-clans of the Karlals.

References 

7.  Nms News National Media Service

8. Sardar Munir Akhter

9.Satora Ke Awaz Hd News

Populated places in Abbottabad District
Villages in Pakistan